Edda Ceccoli (born 26 June 1947) was Captain Regent of San Marino from 1 October 1991 to 1 April 1992.  She served as co-Regent with Marino Riccardi. She has been elected to two five-year terms in the Great and Good Council. She is a member of Partito Democratico Cristano Sammarinese.

From 2000 to 2002 she was Particular Secretary of the Secretary of State of Health.

References

1947 births
20th-century women politicians
21st-century women politicians
Captains Regent of San Marino
Members of the Grand and General Council
Female heads of state
Living people
Sammarinese women in politics
Female heads of government